Lior Rosner is an Israeli-born film, TV and classical music composer, conductor, and theme branding expert.

Rosner created the theme for The Ellen DeGeneres Show.  He was a nominee for an International Film Music Critics Association nominee award for “They’ll Remember You” an orchestral accompanied choral showpiece for the end titles from the movie Valkyrie.

Early life 
Born in Israel, Rosner graduated with a degree in music composition and theory graduate from the Jerusalem Academy of Music And Dance He moved from to Los Angeles, where he studied graduate music at UCLA, and conducting at the USC Thornton School of Music.

Lior’s film scoring career began as a staff composer at Fox Entertainment, where he provided scores for over 200 episodes of children TV shows and movies. He became a freelance composer, scoring for Disney/ABC. Rosen then created the theme and interstitial music for The Ellen DeGeneres Show.

Film and TV scores 
Rosner's film work includes the scores for Wedding Doll, Sins of Our Youth, The Geography Club and Seconds Apart. Other recent credits include music and arrangements X-Men: Days Of Future Past, Jack the Giant Slayer, Diary of a Wimpy Kid, Valkyrie, Superman Returns, Fantastic 4: The Rise of the Silver Surfer, Little Fockers, The Invasion, Cellular, Hide & Seek, Cirque du Freak: The Vampire's Assistant

Rosner created scores for The Odds, The Losers, Battle Creek, The Pee-Wee Herman Show on Broadway and additional music for the ABC show Forever.

More recent credits have included the revival of Will & Grace and the Netflix series AJ and the Queen.

Video game, trailers and commercials 
Rosner wrote the score for Sony video games SOCOM Fight Team Bravo 3 and Syphon Filter Dark Mirror.

Rosner also created and music for film and television trailers including, Games Of Thrones, The Imitation Game, Paddington, Harry Potter and The Deathly Hallows, The Zoo Keeper, Yogi Bear, Jack And Jill, Speed Racer, Walk the Line, Dreamer, Atonement, and Toy Story 3.

Rosner has done musicu commercial brands: Mercedes Benz, Campari and Hitachi.

Rosner lives and works in Los Angeles, California.

Classical music works 
In addition to his music scoring career, Rosner continues to enjoy writing classical music. His most recent recording, released on Bridge Records, is the album, Awake and Dream, featuring Soprano Janai Brugger, violinist Katia Popov (concertmaster of the Hollywood Bowl Orchestra), pianist Steven Vanhauwaert, The Hollywood Studio Symphony with Rosner as composer, conductor and pianist.,

Also released is In Time of Silver Rain, Seven Poems by Langston Hughes, also features Janai Brugger and Rosner on piano. Rosner’s classical works have been performed live in concert by the Armadillo String Quartet, the Pacific composers forum and most recently by the Kaleidoscope Orchestra.

References

 

Year of birth missing (living people)
Living people
Male television composers
Television composers